Alejandro Fantino (born 26 September 1971) is an Argentine radio- and TV host.

He was born in San Vicente, a small village in Castellanos, Santa Fe.

Awards
 2013 Martín Fierro Awards
 Best male TV host

References

1971 births
Living people
Argentine radio presenters
Argentine television presenters
People from Castellanos Department